Geri or GERI may refer to:

Places

Villages in Iran
Geri, Iran
Deraz Geri
Geri Doveji
Khvajeh Geri

Elsewhere
Geri, Cyprus, a village
Geri, Georgia, a village in Georgia
Geri route, a set of streets in Chandigarh, India

People with the name
Geri (given name)
Geri (surname)

Arts, entertainment, and media
Geri, a wolf in Norse mythology from the story "Geri and Freki"
Geri Reig, a 1980 album by German band Der Plan
Geri's Game, a 1997 short film by Pixar

Other uses

Geri, a Somali word for giraffe
Geri's Hamburgers, a defunct fast food restaurant chain in the United States
Mawashi geri, a kick in Japanese martial arts